Hapoel Tel Aviv is an Israeli women's football club from Tel Aviv. The club competed in the Israeli First League and the Israeli Women's Cup, winning them both in 2000–01 and competing in 2001–02 UEFA Women's Cup. The club folded in 2002. The club relaunched in 2019 and competed in the third league. They won the third division title in 2020–21 and were promoted to the second league.

Titles
Ligat Nashim (1)
2000–01
Israeli Cup (1)
2000–01
Israeli 3rd League (1)
2020–2021

References

Women's football clubs in Israel
Association football clubs established in 1998
Association football clubs disestablished in 2002
Defunct football clubs in Israel